Ali Akbar Moradi (born 1957) is a well known Kurdish musician and composer. He was born in Gahvareh in the Kermanshah Province of Iran. He started music at a very early age, and learned the Kurdish maqam repertoire and tanbur (Kurdish lute) under the supervision of Kurdish masters such as Mirza Sayyed Ali Kafashyan, Kaki Allah Morad Hamidi and Sayyed Vali Hosseyni. He gave his first recital in 1971 in Kermanshah. In 1981, he began collaborating with the Kurdish singer Shahram Nazeri, and performed throughout Europe and North America. He is an expert on the tanbur instrument, which is considered sacred in Kurdish Yarsani and sufi music.

He has performed music in New York City, San Francisco and London. On 30 September 2006, he gave a special program as part of Voices of Kurdistan in San Francisco World Music Festival, he has been appointed as one of fifty of the best musicians around the globe by a British music magazine. Moradi has written a book about playing Kurdish tabur, which includes most well-known maqams of tanbur.

Works
 Fire of Passion, Kurdish Tanbur Music of Iran, 1999.
 Kurdaneh, 2001.
 Whisper, 2001.
 Kurdish Music from Iran, 2002.
 In The Mirror of the Sky, with Kayhan Kalhor, 2004.

Music festivals
Montana Folk Festival, Butte, MT, 2014.
San Francisco World Music Festival, 2006.
Rhythm Sticks Festival, London, 2004
Broadway Theater, New York, 2004.
UC Irvine, California, 2004,
Queen Elizabeth Hall, London, 2000.

References

External links

Ali Akbar Moradi

People from Kermanshah Province
Iranian Kurdish people
Kurdish male singers
Living people
1957 births